Matt Whyman is a British novelist, also known for his work as an advice columnist for numerous teenage magazines.

Biography
Born in 1969, Matt Whyman grew up in Berkhamsted, Hertfordshire, and has an MA from the UEA Creative Writing course (1992) taught by Sir Malcolm Bradbury and Rose Tremain. He has written widely for all ages across a range of subjects in fiction and non-fiction, notably Boy Kills Man (2004), a critically acclaimed story of Colombian child assassins which is published in translation around the world, the bestselling comic memoir Walking With Sausage Dogs (2011) and The Unexpected Genius of Pigs (2018).

In 1995, Whyman became the first male advice columnist for 19 magazine. He went on to hold a 10-year residency as AOL UK's online agony uncle, and for 18 years at Bliss Magazine from 1996 until its closure in 2014. He has created many national health awareness campaigns for BBC Radio 1, CLIC Sargent, Macmillan and Brook Advisory, written widely on teenage issues for the national press, and often appeared on radio and television in this role. In 1997, Whyman co-presented a series of ITV's cult Saturday morning sex and relationships show, Love Bites, and from 2011-2013 served as the resident agony uncle on BBC Radio 1's live advice show, The Surgery.

As well as teaching creative writing across the UK, and for the British Council in Russia, Mexico, Africa and the Middle East, Whyman is an established ghostwriter and collaborative author. In the latter role, he has worked on books with Billy Connolly (Tracks Across America, 2016), Charles Eugster (Age is Just a Number 2017), Matthew Syed (You are Awesome, 2018) and Gareth Southgate (Anything is Possible, 2020) among others. In 2015, he wrote the graphic novel Username: Evie, with the story provided by Joe Sugg, who was credited as the lead author of the work, and with the art provided by Amrit Birdi, as well as two further titles, Username: Regenerated (2016) and Username: Uprising (2017). Whyman is also the author of The Nice & Accurate Good Omens TV Companion (2019) to accompany the series, Good Omens, based upon the novel by Neil Gaiman and Terry Pratchett, and Our Planet, based on the Netflix series, with a foreword by Sir David Attenborough.

Matt Whyman lives in West Sussex. He is married with four children.

Books

Novels 

Man or Mouse (2000), Hodder Headline
Columbia Road (2002) Hodder Headline
Superhuman (2003), Hodder Children's Books
Boy Kills Man (2004), Hodder Children's Books
The Wild (2005), Hodder Children's Books
So Below (2005), Simon & Schuster (republished as Street Runners in 2008)
Inside the Cage (2007), Simon & Schuster /Atheneum Books (as Icecore)
Goldstrike (2009), Simon & Schuster & Atheneum Books
Lazlo Strangolov's Feather & Bone (2009) Walker Books
Lazlo Strangolov's Tooth & Claw (2011) Walker Books
Battle Champions: Academy Attack (2013) Simon & Schuster (co-written as Jack Carson)
Battle Champions: Canyon Clash (2013) Simon & Schuster (co-written as Jack Carson)
Battle Champions: Swampland Slam (2013) Simon & Schuster co-written as Jack Carson)
Battle Champions: Terminal Takedown (2013) Simon & Schuster (co-written as Jack Carson)
The Savages (2013) Hot Key Books 
American Savage (2014) Hot Key Books
Boy Kills Man Tenth Anniversary Edition (2014) Hot Key Books
Bad Apple (2016) Hot Key Books

Non fiction 

Wise Guides: Smoking (2000), Hodder Children's Books
Wise Guides: Drinking (2002), Hodder Children's Books
XY: A Toolkit for Life (2002), Hodder Children's Books (republished as Unzipped in 2007)
XY100: 100 strategies for life (2004), Hodder Children's Books
Wise Guides: Family Break Up (2005), Hodder Children's Books
Oink / Pig in the Middle  (2011) Hodder Headline
Walking With Sausage Dogs (2012) Hodder Headline
The Unexpected Genius of Pigs (2018) HarperCollins
The Nice & Accurate Good Omens TV Companion (2019) Headline
Our Planet (2019) HarperCollins.
Be More Sausage (2020) HarperCollins
Failure is an Option (2022) Vertebrate Publishing

Short stories 

 Visionary (1992) Minerva (published in New Writing 2 edited by Malcolm Bradbury & Andrew Motion
 crusoe.com (2000) Hodder Headline (published in the New English Library of Internet Short Stories edited by Maxim Jakubowski
 Enfemme (2001) HarperCollins (published in Girls' Night Out/Boys' Night In edited by Jessica Adams, Chris Manby & Fiona Walker
 Eleven Pipers Piping (2006) Virago (published in Twelve Days edited by Shelley Silas
 Eclipsed (2010) Walker Books (published in The Truth is Dead edited by Marcus Sedgwick
 Uplifted (2013) Hot Key Books (published in The Booby Trap edited by Dawn O'Porter)
 Ghost Story (2014) Andersen Press (published in War Girls)
 Eclipsed (2015) Oxford University Press (published in War & Conflict edited by Benjamin Hulme-Cross)

Prizes and awards

2004   Booktrust Teenage Prize   (shortlist)   Boy Kills Man
2005   Stockport Schools' Book Award   (shortlist)   Boy Kills Man
2006   De Jonge Jury (Netherlands)   (shortlist)   Boy Kills Man
2006   Wirral Paperback of the Year   (shortlist)   Boy Kills Man
2006   Renfrewshire Teenage Book Award   (shortlist)   The Wild
2007   Wirral Paperback of the Year   (longlist)   The Wild
2013   North East Teenage Book Award  (shortlist)  The Savages
2014 Angus Book Award (winner), the Savages

References

1969 births
Living people
Alumni of the University of East Anglia
21st-century English novelists
British advice columnists
British writers of young adult literature
English male novelists
21st-century English male writers
People from West Sussex